From One is the first major label album by American alternative metal band Ra, released on October 22, 2002. It features the band's hit single, "Do You Call My Name", which had a music video and was followed by their second single, "Rectifier". From One reached number 154 on the Billboard 200. Universal Music Group originally hosted a listening party so that people could listen to the entire album before it was released.

The first track "Do You Call My Name" was featured during the introduction and before commercial breaks during the 2006 NFL Draft on ESPN, as well as video games MX Unleashed and Tiger Woods PGA Tour 2003. It also was used as an entrance theme for a wrestler Shawn Daivari during his Ring of Honor days, in addition to Ophidian as a singles theme on the independent circuit, most notably in Chikara Pro. The second track "Rectifier" was featured on the game Project Gotham Racing 2. Ra was featured as Artist of the Month on antimusic.com. Keavin Wiggins of AntiMusic named From One the top album of the decade.

Explanation of inspiration
All quotes taken from The Gauntlet's interview with lead singer Sahaj Ticotin

The concepts

– "I wanted to hear Metallica with the Police's Andy Summers playing guitar and Sting singing. It bothered me that there wasn't a band like that, so I formed one,"

– "There's also an element of majesty that needs to be portrayed in the music's presentation. One of my favorite movies is The Matrix, and the look of that film is a real inspiration. A lot of the concepts presented in the film are ideas that feature in our songs."

The lyrics

– "I rarely write from my own experience. I spend most of the time observing the circumstances of those around me."

– "My lyrics don't read like Shakespeare, but he's definitely influenced my work"

Track listing

Band members
Sahaj Ticotin – lead vocals, guitar
Ben Carroll – guitar
Sean Corcoran – bass, backing vocals
Skoota Warner – drums

References

Ra (American band) albums
2002 debut albums

Progressive metal albums by American artists